The voiceless retroflex sibilant fricative is a type of consonantal sound used in some spoken languages. A distinction can be made between laminal, apical, and sub-apical articulations. Only one language, Toda, appears to have more than one voiceless retroflex sibilant, and it distinguishes subapical palatal from apical postalveolar retroflex sibilants; that is, both the tongue articulation and the place of contact on the roof of the mouth are different.

Some scholars also posit the voiceless retroflex approximant distinct from the fricative.

Features

Features of the voiceless retroflex fricative:

Occurrence
In the following transcriptions, diacritics may be used to distinguish between apical  and laminal .

The commonality of  cross-linguistically is 6% in a phonological analysis of 2155 languages.

Voiceless retroflex non-sibilant fricative

Features 
Features of the voiceless retroflex non-sibilant fricative:

Occurrence

See also
 Index of phonetics articles

Notes

References

External links
 
 

Fricative consonants
Retroflex consonants
Pulmonic consonants
Voiceless oral consonants
Central consonants